Claudia Losch (born 10 January 1960) is a retired German shot putter. She is the 1984 Olympic Champion. Shortly after the Olympics, she competed in the 100 metres at the Friendship Games in Prague, which were held as an event for sportspeople from Communist countries who were boycotting that year's Olympics: she was unable to repeat her Olympic medal success there. At the 1988 Olympic Games, she finished fifth. She is also the 1989 World Indoor Champion and won the European Indoor title three times.

Losch won the German indoor championship in the shot put in 1983, 1984, 1987, 1988, and 1989.  She won the German championship from 1982 through 1990, nine times in a row.

International competitions

References

External links

1960 births
Living people
People from Herne, North Rhine-Westphalia
Sportspeople from Arnsberg (region)
West German female shot putters
German female shot putters
Olympic athletes of West Germany
Olympic gold medalists for West Germany
Athletes (track and field) at the 1984 Summer Olympics
Athletes (track and field) at the 1988 Summer Olympics
World Athletics Championships athletes for West Germany
World Athletics Championships athletes for Germany
Medalists at the 1984 Summer Olympics
Olympic gold medalists in athletics (track and field)
Universiade medalists in athletics (track and field)
Universiade silver medalists for West Germany
World Athletics Indoor Championships medalists
World Athletics Indoor Championships winners
Medalists at the 1983 Summer Universiade